Guwahati Football Club is an Indian professional football team based in Guwahati, Assam, that competed in the I-League 2nd Division, and Assam State Premier League. The team was launched in December 2014 to promote Assamese football.

History
After breaking away from his stake in the Indian Super League franchise, NorthEast United, Sanjive Narain Co-founded Guwahati Football Club in December 2014. The team was formerly launched on 27 May 2015 with Spanish coach, Anxo Valcarcel, signed as the teams' first head coach. Upon launching the team, Narain said that the main goal of the team was not earn promotion to the I-League and thus give Assam a club in India's top football competition.

The team is jointly owned by Sanjive Naraine, Jayanta Barua, Bipul Saikia, Casper Investment Private Limited, Dadul Chodhury, Kamal Chandra Das and Pulak Goswami.

The team played their first competition in May 2015 when they participated in the revamped Assam State Premier League. Their first match was against Tezpur United FC, ending 0–0. Guwahati barely qualified for the finals as they ended regular season campaign on fourth place in Lower Assam zone. They were knocked-out in the first-round of the finals by Baarhoongkha on away goals, 3–3.

On 1 October 2015, it was confirmed that Guwahati would participate in the I-League 2nd Division.

Guwahati FC started off with their I-league 2nd Div Eastern Conference campaign on 14 November in Barasat Stadium against Mohammedan Sporting. Their group also included Gangtok Himalayan SC, NEROCA FC and Fateh Hyderabad AFC.
Guwahati FC finished 4th in group, ahead of Fateh Hyderabad, and failed to Qualify to the next round.
Guwahati FC did not participate in the 2016–17 season of I-League 2nd Division, neither in Guwahati Sports Association's League in 2016–2017 season.

Partnership
In 2015, Guwahati FC tied up with Delhi-based Anglian Management Group and Brazil's Clube Atlético Paranaense to set up the first international football Academy in North-East India based out of Guwahati. The Academy planned to train a hundred elite youth footballers from various age groups each of the next three years as well as run numerous programmes throughout the year aimed at attracting many more youth to the sport. Training would be done under the supervision of CAP's Brazilian coaches who, in addition to making regular visits to Guwahati, would also train Guwahati FC coaches at the CAP-owned facilities in Curitiba, Brazil.

Luiz Greco, the director of Clube Atlético Paranaense said: “From the beginning of our tie-up with Anglian, we have been exposed to the huge potential of opportunities that Indian football has to offer. We appreciate them putting their trust in us to involve us in this project and we have been very impressed with the vision set forth by the management of Guwahati FC from the outset.”

Affiliated clubs
The following club was affiliated with Guwahati FC:
  Clube Atlético Paranaense (2015—2017)

Kit manufacturers and shirt sponsors

See also
 Assam Football Association
 Gauhati Town Club
 List of football clubs in Assam

References

External links

Guwahati FC at Global Sports Archive

Association football clubs established in 2014
Football clubs in Assam
Sport in Guwahati
I-League 2nd Division clubs
2014 establishments in Assam